Shout or Shouts may refer to:

 Shout (sound), a loud vocalization

Films and television 
 The Shout, a 1978 film by Jerzy Skolimowski
 Shout! The Story of Johnny O'Keefe, 1986 television movie about the Australian singer
 Shout (film), a 1991 movie starring John Travolta
  Shout, a character on the children's television series The Fresh Beat Band

Music 

 Shout (Black gospel music), a form of exuberant, fast-paced church music originating among slaves in the southern United States.
 Shout (band), a Christian rock band in the late 1980s
 Shout Records, a record label
 Shout! The Mod Musical  , a Broadway musical featuring songs from the 1960s
 Shout! The Legend of The Wild One, a musical based on the life of Johnny O'Keefe

Albums 
 Shout! (Isley Brothers album), by The Isley Brothers
 Shout (Devo album)
 Shout! (Gov't Mule album)

Songs 
 "Shout" (Ant & Dec song), by  PJ & Duncan
 "Shout" (Isley Brothers song), by the Isley Brothers, covered by Lulu, The Beatles and many others
 "Shout" (Tears for Fears song), by Tears for Fears, covered by many artists, including as "Shout 2000" by Disturbed
 "Shout" (Black Tide song)
 Shout (Shout for England song), an unofficial England national football team Fifa World Cup 2010 anthem
 "Shout!", B-side of Depeche Mode's single "New Life"
 "Shout", B-side of Michael Jackson's single "Cry"
 "Shouts", a song by P.O.D. from The Fundamental Elements of Southtown
 "Shout!!!", a Japanese song by Idoling

People
 Alfred Shout (1882–1915), Australian soldier awarded the Victoria Cross

Published works 
 Shout (magazine), a magazine for teenage girls in the United Kingdom
 Shout!: The Beatles in Their Generation, a book by Philip Norman
 Shout NY, a magazine from New York City in the late 1990s and early 1960s
 Shout (memoir), a poetic memoir by Laurie Halse Anderson

Other uses
 An Australian, British, Canadian, Irish, and New Zealand term referring to buying a round of drinks
 Shout (paying), Australian term for paying for a round of drinks or other similar transaction
 Shout, a household cleaning product produced by S. C. Johnson
 Shout, or ring shout, a religious dance originating among African slaves in the Americas
 Shouting (computing), using all caps on social media, which is considered rude

See also
 "Shout! Shout! (Knock Yourself Out)", a 1962 song
 Showt, a city in Iran